Wheelchair basketball at the 1964 Summer Paralympics consisted of two events for men.

Medal summary 

Source: Paralympic.org

See also
Basketball at the 1964 Summer Olympics

References 

 

1964 Summer Paralympics events
1964
1964 in basketball
International basketball competitions hosted by Japan